The following lists contain Canadian soccer clubs who have played in US-based leagues at Division I, II, III, or below in the United States soccer league system.

Men's teams

Active teams

Division I

Division III

Lower divisions

Former teams

Division I

Division II

Division III

Lower divisions

Women's teams

Active teams

Division II

Former teams

Division II

See also
List of association football clubs playing in the league of another country

Canada
Soccer clubs in Canada